The Italian Union of Seventh-Day Adventist Christian Churches (UICCA), part of the worldwide fellowship of the Seventh-day Adventist Church, is a Protestant denomination in Italy.

The Union's full members, as of 30 June 2020, are 9,359, worshiping in 107 local churches.

In 1986 Italian Seventh-day Adventists first signed an agreement with the Italian government, in accordance with article 8 of the Italian Constitution, which regulates the relations between the Republic and religious minorities. Three successive agreements were later signed. The latter of these agreements was approved by Parliament and made law in 2009.

Through the Voce della Speranza (VDS) organization, the UICCA has created the "Hope Media Italia" Adventist media center, which has both radio (RVS) and TV (HCI) branches.

See also
Protestantism in Italy
General Conference of Seventh-day Adventists
Inter-European Division of Seventh-day Adventists

References

External links
Official website
 

Seventh-Day Adventist Christian Churches
History of the Seventh-day Adventist Church
Christian denominations in Italy
Italy
Seventh-day Adventist Church in Europe